Johann von Mengede (also Johann von Mengden, called Osthof) (c. 1400 — 15 August 1469) was a knight of the Teutonic Knights. Most notably, from 1442 to 1450, he was Komtur of Reval and then from 1450 to 1469 a Master (Landmiester) of the Livonian Order. He was elected as the Landmaster of Livonia in April, 1450.

He is the best known representative of the Brandenburg noble family from Mengede.

History 
In 1461—1464, when Landmaster of Livonia Johann von Mengede arrested the Archbishop of Riga, Silvester Stodewescher and plundered Archbishopic lands, troops from Pskov occupied the eastern part of the Archbishopic lands  — Adzele (presently Pytalovo). Adzele inhabitants were either deported or converted to Orthodoxy.

References 

Baltic-German people
Masters of the Livonian Order
1400s births
1469 deaths
Year of birth uncertain
Johann Osthoff von Mengede